Na Suang is a tambon (subdistrict) of Det Udom District, in Ubon Ratchathani Province, Thailand. In 2021, it had a population of 9,044 people. Neighbouring subdistricts are (clockwise from the south) Pa Mong, Sa Saming, Mueang Si Khai, Na Di, Na Yia, and Na Rueang.

History
The region was first settled in the 1640s, the first settlement was located in the current location of Na Suang village and gained subdistrict status in 1892. While the Na Suang subdistrict is much older, the Sukhaphiban Na Suang (สุขาภิบาลนาส่วง) as the local administration unit was established in the central region of the tambon in 1963, covered Na Suang and Pa Muang villages, as well as some portions of Kut Yang and Na Huay Khaen, 3.40 km2 in total. Effective May 25, 2009, it was upgraded to a subdistrict municipality. The remaining area, around 52 km2, has been governed by another local government,  the Subdistrict Administrative Organization of Na Suang.

The tambon were cut off to establish new subdistricts three times including in 1947 to creat Na Yia, in 1966 to creat Na Charoen, and in 1988 to create Pa Mong.

Geography
The tambon is located in the northernmost region of the Det Udom district, which is the low river plain of two tributaries of the Mun River—Khaosan Creek and Khaen Creek—and covered 55.40 kilometers of squares. The total forest area is only 0.51 km2 or 9.21 percent of the subdistrict area.

Administration
The tambon is divided into 10 administrative villages (mubans; หมู่บ้าน), two of which, Na Suang (นาส่วง) and Sao Lao (เสาเล้า) villages, each was further divided into two community groups (Mu; หมู่). The area is shared by 2 local governments; the township area was administrated by the Na Suang Subdistrict Municipality (เทศบาลตำบลนาส่วง) while the remaining was covered by the Subdistrict Administrative Organization of Na Suang (องค์การบริหารส่วนตำบลนาส่วง; Na Suang SAO).

The following is a list of the subdistrict's mubans, which roughly correspond to the villages, as of the 2021 census.

References

Tambon of Ubon Ratchathani Province